Billy Bob Thornton (born August 4, 1955) is an American actor, filmmaker and musician. He had his first break when he co-wrote and starred in the 1992 thriller One False Move, and received international attention after writing, directing, and starring in the independent drama film Sling Blade (1996), for which he won an Academy Award for Best Adapted Screenplay and was nominated for an Academy Award for Best Actor. He appeared in several major film roles in the 1990s following Sling Blade, including Oliver Stone's neo-noir U Turn (1997), political drama Primary Colors (1998), science fiction disaster film Armageddon (1998), the highest-grossing film of that year, and the crime drama A Simple Plan (1998), which earned him his third Oscar nomination.

In the 2000s, Thornton achieved further success starring in dramas Monster's Ball (2001), The Man Who Wasn't There (2001), and Friday Night Lights (2004); and comedy films, Intolerable Cruelty (2003), and Bad Santa (2003). In 2014, Thornton starred as Lorne Malvo in the first season of the anthology series Fargo, earning a nomination for the Outstanding Lead Actor in a Miniseries or TV Movie at the Emmy Awards and won Best Actor in a Miniseries or TV Film at the 72nd Golden Globe Awards. In 2016 - 2021 he starred for four seasons in an Amazon original series, Goliath, which earned him a Golden Globe Award for Best Actor – Television Series Drama.

Thornton has written a variety of films, usually set in the Southern United States and mainly co-written with Tom Epperson, including A Family Thing (1996) and The Gift (2000). After Sling Blade, he directed several other films, including Daddy and Them (2001), All the Pretty Horses (2000), and Jayne Mansfield's Car (2012).

Thornton has received the President's Award from the Academy of Science Fiction, Fantasy & Horror Films, a Special Achievement Award from the National Board of Review, and a star on the Hollywood Walk of Fame. He has also been nominated for an Emmy Award, four Golden Globes, and three Screen Actors Guild Awards. In addition to film work, Thornton began a career as a singer-songwriter. He has released four solo albums and is the vocalist of the rock band the Boxmasters.

Thornton has been vocal about his distaste for celebrity culture, choosing to keep out of the public eye. He was unable to avoid media intrusion concerning his marriage to Angelina Jolie.

Early life 
Thornton was born on August 4, 1955, in Hot Springs, Arkansas, the son of Virginia Roberta (née Faulkner; died July 29, 2017), a self-proclaimed psychic, and William Raymond "Billy Ray" Thornton (November 1929 – August 1974), a high school history teacher and basketball coach. His brother Jimmy Don (April 1958 – October 1988) wrote a number of songs; Thornton recorded two of them ("Island Avenue" and "Emily") on his solo albums. He is of part Irish descent. He has another brother, John David.

Thornton lived in numerous places in Arkansas during his childhood, including Alpine, Malvern, and Mount Holly. He was raised Methodist in an extended family in a shack that had no electricity or plumbing. He graduated from Malvern High School in 1973. A good high school baseball player, he tried out for the Kansas City Royals, but was released after an injury. After a short period laying asphalt for the Arkansas State Transportation Department, he attended Henderson State University to pursue studies in psychology but dropped out after two semesters.

In the mid-1980s Thornton settled in Los Angeles to pursue his career as an actor with future writing partner Tom Epperson. He had a difficult time succeeding as an actor and worked in telemarketing, offshore wind farming and fast food management between auditioning for acting jobs. He also played the drums and sang with South African rock band Jack Hammer. While working as a waiter for an industry event, he served film director and screenwriter Billy Wilder. He struck up a conversation with Wilder, who advised Thornton to consider a career as a screenwriter.

Career

Acting and filmmaking

In September 1987, Thornton appeared on stage in a one-act play, "Beethoven Symphonies," as part of the West Coast Theatre Ensemble in Los Angeles. Thornton's first screen role was in 1988 South of Reno, where he played a small role as a counter man in a restaurant. He also made an appearance as a pawn store clerk in the 1987 Matlock episode "The Photographer". Another one of his early screen roles was as a cast member on the CBS sitcom Hearts Afire and in 1989 he appeared as an angry heckler in Adam Sandler's debut film Going Overboard. His role as the villain in 1992's One False Move, which he also co-wrote, brought him to the attention of critics. He also had small roles in the 1990s films Indecent Proposal, On Deadly Ground, Bound by Honor, and Tombstone. He went on to write, direct, and star in the 1996 independent film Sling Blade. The film, an expansion of the short film Some Folks Call It a Sling Blade, introduced the story of a mentally disabled man imprisoned for a gruesome and seemingly inexplicable murder.

Sling Blade garnered international acclaim. Thornton's screenplay earned him an Academy Award for Best Adapted Screenplay, a Writers Guild of America Award, and an Edgar Award, while his performance received Oscar and Screen Actors Guild nominations for Best Actor. In 1998, Thornton portrayed the James Carville-like Richard Jemmons in Primary Colors. He adapted the book All the Pretty Horses into a 2000 film of the same name. The negative experience (he was forced to cut more than an hour of footage) led to his decision to never direct another film; a subsequent release, Daddy and Them, had been filmed earlier. Also in 2000, an early script which he and Tom Epperson wrote together was made into The Gift.

In 2000, Thornton appeared in Travis Tritt's music video for the song "Modern Day Bonnie and Clyde". His screen persona has been described by the press as that of a "tattooed, hirsute man's man". He appeared in several major film roles following the success of Sling Blade, including 1998's Armageddon and A Simple Plan. In 2001, he directed Daddy and Them while securing starring roles in three Hollywood films: Monster's Ball, Bandits, and The Man Who Wasn't There, for which he received many awards.

Thornton played a malicious mall Santa in 2003's Bad Santa, a black comedy that performed well at the box office and established him as a leading comic actor, and in the same year, portrayed a womanizing President of the United States in the British romantic comedy film Love Actually. He stated that, following the success of Bad Santa, audiences "like to watch him play that kind of guy" and that "casting directors call him up when they need an asshole". He referred to this when he said that "it's kinda that simple... you know how narrow the imagination in this business can be".

In 2004, Thornton played David Crockett in The Alamo. Later that year, he received a star on the Hollywood Walk of Fame on October 7. He appeared in the 2006 comic film School for Scoundrels. In the film, he plays a self-help doctor, which was written specifically for him. More recent films include 2007 drama The Astronaut Farmer and the comedy Mr. Woodcock, in which he played a sadistic gym teacher. In September 2008, he starred in the action film Eagle Eye. He has also expressed an interest in directing another film, possibly a period piece about cave explorer Floyd Collins, based on the book Trapped! The Story of Floyd Collins.

In 2014, Thornton starred as sociopathic hitman Lorne Malvo in the FX miniseries Fargo, inspired by the 1996 film of the same name, for which he won a Golden Globe for Best Actor in a Mini-Series.

Thornton made a guest appearance on The Big Bang Theory in 2014, where he played a middle-aged urologist who gets excited about every woman who touches him.

"Goliath", a television series by Amazon Studios, features Thornton as a formerly brilliant and personable lawyer, who is now washed up and alcoholic. It premiered on October 13, 2016, on Amazon Prime Video. On February 15, 2017, Amazon announced the series had been renewed for a second season. Goliath was renewed for two additional seasons, with the final season released on September 24, 2021, by Amazon  Prime Video.

In 2017, Thornton starred in the music video Stand Down by Kario Salem (musically known as K.O.). It received the Best Music Video award from the Toronto Shorts International Film Festival and has had 13 million views on Facebook and counting.

Music
In the 1970s, Thornton was the drummer of a blues rock band named Tres Hombres. Guitarist Billy Gibbons referred to the band as "the best little cover band in Texas", and Thornton bears a tattoo with the band's name on it.

In 1985, Thornton joined Piet Botha in the South African rock band Jack Hammer, while Botha worked in Los Angeles. Thornton recorded one studio album with Jack Hammer, Death of a Gypsy, which was released in 1986. September 

In 2001, Thornton released the album Private Radio on Lost Highway Records. Subsequent albums include The Edge of the World (2003), Hobo (2005) and Beautiful Door (2007). He performed the Warren Zevon song The Wind on the tribute album Enjoy Every Sandwich: Songs of Warren Zevon. Thornton recorded a cover of the Johnny Cash classic "Ring of Fire" with Earl Scruggs, for the Oxford American magazine's Southern Music CD in 2001. The song also appeared on Scruggs' 2001 album Earl Scruggs and Friends.

In 2007, Thornton formed The Boxmasters with J.D. Andrew.

CBC incident

On April 8, 2009, Thornton and his musical group The Boxmasters appeared on the CBC Radio One program Q. The appearance was widely criticized and received international attention after Thornton was persistently unintelligible and discourteous to host Jian Ghomeshi. Thornton eventually explained he had "instructed" the show's producers to not ask questions about his movie career. Ghomeshi had mentioned Thornton's acting in the introduction. Thornton had also complained Canadian audiences were like "mashed potatoes without the gravy." The following night, opening for Willie Nelson at Toronto's Massey Hall, Thornton said mid-set he liked Canadians but not Ghomeshi, which was greeted with boos and catcalls. The Boxmasters did not continue the tour in Canada as, according to Thornton, some of the crew and band had the flu.

Filmography

Discography 

Studio albums
 Private Radio (2001)
 The Edge of the World (2003)
 Hobo (2005)
 Beautiful Door (2007)

Awards

Personal life

Relationships and children

Thornton has been married six times. He has four children by three women.

From 1978 to 1980, he was married to Melissa Lee Gatlin, who in her divorce petition cited "incompatibility and adultery on his part". They had a daughter Amanda (Brumfield), who in 2008 was sentenced to 20 years in prison for the death of her friend's one-year-old daughter.  Amanda was freed in 2020 after a deal was reached with prosecutors prior to an evidentiary hearing to provide medical and scientific evidence of her innocence.

Thornton married actress Toni Lawrence in 1986; they separated the following year and divorced in 1988.

From 1990 to 1992, he was married to actress Cynda Williams, whom he cast in his writing debut One False Move (1992).

In 1993, Thornton married Playboy model Pietra Dawn Cherniak, with whom he had two sons Harry James and William. The marriage ended in 1997 with Cherniak accusing Thornton of spousal abuse, sometimes in front of his children.

Thornton was engaged to be married to actress Laura Dern, whom he dated from 1997 to 1999, but in 2000, he married actress Angelina Jolie, with whom he starred in Pushing Tin (1999) and who was 20 years his junior. The marriage became known for the couple's eccentric displays of affection, which reportedly included wearing vials of each other's blood around their necks; Thornton later clarified that the "vials" were actually two small lockets, each containing only a single drop of blood. Thornton and Jolie announced the adoption of a child from Cambodia in March 2002, but it was later revealed that Jolie had adopted the child as a single parent. They separated in June 2002 and divorced the following year.

In 2003, Thornton began a relationship with makeup effects crew member Connie Angland with whom he has a daughter Bella. Although he once said that he likely would not marry again since marriage "doesn't work" for him, his representatives confirmed that he and Angland were married on October 22, 2014, in Los Angeles.

Health problems 
During his early years in Los Angeles, Thornton was admitted to a hospital and diagnosed with myocarditis, a heart condition brought on by malnutrition. He has since said that he follows a vegan diet and is "extremely healthy", eating no junk food as he is allergic to wheat and dairy.

Thornton has obsessive–compulsive disorder. Various idiosyncratic behaviors have been well documented in interviews with Thornton; among these is a phobia of antique furniture, a disorder shared by Dwight Yoakam's character Doyle Hargraves in the Thornton-penned Sling Blade and by Thornton's own character in the 2001 film Bandits. Additionally, he has stated that he has a fear of certain types of silverware, a trait assumed by his character in 2001's Monster's Ball, in which Grotowski insists on a plastic spoon for his daily bowl of ice cream.

In a 2004 interview with The Independent, Thornton explained,

Other
Thornton is a baseball fan and a devout fan of the St. Louis Cardinals. In his movie contracts, one of his demands is a television in his trailer with a satellite dish so he can watch the Cardinals play. He narrated The 2006 World Series Film, the year-end retrospective DVD chronicling the Cardinals' championship season. He is also a professed fan of the Indianapolis Colts football team.

Thornton is a self-described Brony, a male fan of My Little Pony: Friendship Is Magic.

References

External links 

  
 
 
 Billy Bob Thornton on Discogs
 
 

1955 births
20th-century American male actors
20th-century American writers
21st-century American male actors
21st-century American singers
21st-century American writers
Actors from Hot Springs, Arkansas
American country drummers
American country rock singers
American country singer-songwriters
American male film actors
American male screenwriters
American male singer-songwriters
American male television actors
American male voice actors
American rock drummers
American rock singers
American people of Irish descent
Best Adapted Screenplay Academy Award winners
Best Drama Actor Golden Globe (television) winners
Best Miniseries or Television Movie Actor Golden Globe winners
Country musicians from Arkansas
Edgar Award winners
Film directors from Arkansas
Living people
Male actors from Arkansas
Male Western (genre) film actors
Malvern High School (Arkansas) alumni
Musicians from Hot Springs, Arkansas
People from Garland County, Arkansas
People from Malvern, Arkansas
People with obsessive–compulsive disorder
Rockabilly musicians
Screenwriters from Arkansas
Singer-songwriters from Arkansas
Writers from Arkansas
Writers Guild of America Award winners
21st-century American male singers